Laadla is a 1994 Indian Hindi-language drama film directed by Raj Kanwar, based on a screenplay written by Anees Bazmee. The film stars Sridevi and Anil Kapoor while Raveena Tandon, Anupam Kher, Farida Jalal, Shakti Kapoor, Prem Chopra, Aruna Irani, Mohnish Bahl and Paresh Rawal play supporting roles.

The film initially starred Divya Bharti as the female lead and she had shot most of the film. However, due to her untimely death in 1993, the film was reshot with Sridevi replacing her. The film is the remake of Kannada film Anuraga Aralithu (1986). In the film, a headstrong factory owner marries the union leader of the factory, to quell his spirit and teach him a lesson. In the process, she ends up learning a few lessons herself.

Laadla was released theatrically on 25 March 1994 and became one of the highest-grossing films of the year. Sridevi's performance in a negative role as Sheetal Jaitley was widely acclaimed and earned her a nomination for the Filmfare Award for Best Actress, while Tandon's performance fetched her a Filmfare Award for Best Supporting Actress nomination.

Plot
Raj "Raju" Verma lives with his disabled and paralyzed mother Gayatri. Before a job interview, he saves textile mill owner Laxminarayan Jetley who offers him job in his factory run by his ambitious adopted daughter, Sheetal. Her competitive attitude and open insults result in several enemies including her henchman Tilak, whom she often slaps and insults.

As a mechanic, Raju confronts her several times for proper treatment of workers. She is enraged when he turns union leader. Raju falls for the mill's modest worker Kajal. Suryadev, a competing owner tries to eliminate Sheetal. Charismatic, Raju guides her on how to handle rival and the workers. Egoistic and angered, Sheetal slaps him who retaliates this reaching her cabin and slaps her too.

Sheetal cannot fire Raju as then she would have to admit. Vengeful, she convinces Gayatri to get her married to Raju.
Reluctantly on Gayatri's order, Raju sacrifices his love for Kajal and marries Sheetal. He lives in his own house and works as a mechanic but moves to Sheetal's luxurious house later upon Gayatri's request. Slowly, he falls in love with Sheetal.

Tensions arise when Sheetal eliminates Kajal, seeing her visiting Raju's house frequently. Kajal turns caretaker of Gayatri. Later, labour issues cause the workers to go on strike. Competing mill owner for benefit of this hires people to set it on fire. Raju is mistakenly arrested. Gayatri visits Sheetal's house to clarify matters.

Insulted and taunted, she collapses but Raju saves her and slaps Sheetal. Guilty, Sheetal who has now feelings for Raju too is kidnapped by Suryadev. Luckily, Raju rescues her. Sheetal improves herself. Kajal turns managing director of her company, as Sheetal quits her job. Everyone live happily ever after.

Cast
 Sridevi as Sheetal Jetley Verma
 Anil Kapoor as Raj "Raju" Verma
 Raveena Tandon as Kajal Bansal
 Farida Jalal as Gayatri Verma
 Aruna Irani as Banobi Jetley
 Anupam Kher as Laxmi Narayan Jetley
 Prem Chopra as Suryadev Bajaj
 Paresh Rawal as Hiravat Bajaj
 Mohnish Behl as Vikram "Vicky" Bajaj
 Shakti Kapoor as Tilak Bhandari
 Alok Nath as Swaraaj Bansal
 Kalpana Iyer as Kamini Shastra
 Arun Bakshi as Mehtu 
 Javed Khan Amrohi Loyal worker in the factory
 Ravi Baswani Loyal worker in the factory 
 Lalit Tiwari as Advocate Devdas Shukla
 Vikram Gokhale as Doctor
 Vaishnavi Mahant in item song
 Ghanashyam Nayak as Gate Watchman

Production
Divya Bharti was originally cast in the role of Sheetal and filmed most of her role, but due to her sudden death on 5 April 1993, she could not complete the film. Later, Sridevi was signed to play the role.

Soundtrack
Producer Nitin Manmohan repeated music directors Anand–Milind and lyricist Sameer after hits like Baaghi, Maha Sangram, Adharm and Bol Radha Bol. The music topped the charts when released. It was among the best selling albums of 1994.

Original Soundtrack label

Awards and nominations
40th Filmfare Awards:

Nominated

 Best Actress – Sridevi
 Best Supporting Actress – Raveena Tandon

References

External links
 

1990s Hindi-language films
Hindi remakes of Kannada films
1994 films
Films scored by Anand–Milind
Films directed by Raj Kanwar